The men's 61 kg freestyle wrestling competitions at the 2014 Commonwealth Games in Glasgow, Scotland was held on 30 July at the Scottish Exhibition and Conference Centre. David Tremblay Won the weight class.

Results
Results:

Bracket

Repechage

References

Wrestling at the 2014 Commonwealth Games